Bittles Bar is bar located near Victoria Square in central Belfast, Northern Ireland. It is one of Belfast's more curious pubs being "flat-iron" in shape (see Flatiron Building in New York). It was built in 1868 and was originally called "The Shakespeare", reflecting its theatrical clientele. 

Today, besides its shape, it is noted for its eclectic range of artwork adorning the triangular lounge - portraits celebrating Ireland's literary and sporting heroes including Samuel Beckett, James Joyce, W B Yeats, Oscar Wilde, George Best, Alex Higgins and Barry McGuigan, plus some of Northern Ireland's most famous politicians.

References

Pubs in Belfast
Restaurants established in 1868